is a video game from the Bomberman series which was developed and published by Hudson Soft for the PC Engine and released on December 10, 1993, in Japan. It was later re-developed by Westone and re-published by Sega as Mega Bomberman on the Sega Mega Drive/Genesis in 1994 in other areas. The PC Engine Bomberman '94 was later released outside Japan through the Virtual Console and the PlayStation Network.

The game supports single-player and multi-player modes. In single player, the player navigates several levels of mazes, destroying creatures with bombs. In multiplayer mode, players defeat each other with bombs.

The Mega Drive/Genesis port had some differences, such as fewer options in multi-player, and some different music (for example, Jammin' Jungle's music in the original version was reused as the first level in Super Bomberman 4, but is entirely different in the other version).

The original Bomberman '94 was released for the Wii Virtual Console on December 2, 2006, in Japan, and was first made available outside Japan on March 23, 2009, in North America and March 23, 2009, in Europe. Bomberman '94 was released for the Wii U Virtual Console on November 19, 2014, in Japan, and on February 2, 2017, in North America and Europe. A port for mobile phones was released in 2008 (renamed Bomberman '08). The previous game, Bomberman '93, was made available instead when Bomberman '94 was released in Japan's Virtual Console.

Bomberman '94 was released on the Japanese PlayStation Network on July 15, 2009, for play on the PlayStation 3 and PlayStation Portable. It was later released in North America on June 2, 2011.

Plot
The inhabitants of Planet Bomber lived in peace, protected by five spirits, until the evil Bagular and his Robot Army invaded. The Spirit Pictures, the source of the spirits' magical power, were destroyed, splitting Planet Bomber into five pieces. Bomberman arrives to restore the Spirit Pictures and reassemble Planet Bomber.

Gameplay
The game is set in six areas: Jammin' Jungle, Vexin' Volcano, Slammin' Sea, Crankin' Castle, Thrashin' Tundra, and the artificial comet of Bagular. Due to the Mega Drive's and Genesis's lack of a fifth controller port, Mega Bomberman only supports four players instead of five. This is the first game in the series that uses the modern design of White Bomberman. Bomberman '94 also introduces Louies to the series. Also, Bomberman '94 introduced several recurring characters, such as female and child Bombers (which were multiplayer skins), red/green/blue bombers and secondary villains, possibly originated from combining a "normal" skin with corresponding colors.

Demos
Before the Mega Bomberman project was targeted as a Mega Drive/Genesis port of Bomberman '94, Factor 5 was asked by Hudson to develop what would be the first installment of the Bomberman series for the Mega Drive/Genesis, already codenamed as Mega Bomberman. As a proof of concept, Factor 5 presented a tech demo that allowed eight players to play and fight at the same time by using two Sega Team Player Adaptors. Hudson was impressed with the job, but in the end they reconsidered the task and licensed the Mega Bomberman project to Westone Co., the creators of the Wonder Boy series, to do a direct Mega Drive/Genesis conversion of the PC-Engine game Bomberman '94 to be published by Sega.

The PC Engine version of Bomberman '94 was used as the basis for Tengai Makyō: Deden no Den, a promotional game featuring characters from the RPG franchise Tengai Makyō and only one arena available by default.

Reception

GamePro gave the Genesis version a positive review, summarizing that "New levels, new enemies, and plenty of other new touches make this game one of the best bombers ever." They particularly approved of the new levels and the animal powerups. Electronic Gaming Monthlys reviewers were divided; while Ed Semrad and Sushi-X echoed GamePro in saying that the new levels and animal powerups made it a strong new installment of Bomberman, Danyon Carpenter and Al Manuel both felt that it was not different enough from the Super NES version to be worth getting. A reviewer for Next Generation, in contrast, argued that the game was too different from the Super NES version, and that the new powerups and animals took away "the beautiful simplicity of the original". He nonetheless recommended it to "any Genesis owner with three friends and a multitap".

Retro Gamer placed the game on their "Top Ten PC Engine Games" list. Complex ranked the game number 91 on their "The 100 Best Sega Genesis Games." Time Extension placed the game on their Best PC Engine / TurboGrafx-16 Games list.

Notes

References

External links

1993 video games
TurboGrafx-16 games
Sega Genesis games
Virtual Console games
Virtual Console games for Wii
Virtual Console games for Wii U
PlayStation Network games
Mobile games
94
Cancelled Super Nintendo Entertainment System games
Cancelled PlayStation (console) games
Cancelled DOS games
Cancelled Game Boy games
Multiplayer and single-player video games
Video games developed in Japan
Video games scored by Jun Chikuma
Hudson Soft games
Action video games
Maze games
Westone Bit Entertainment games